The Malta national under-21 football team is the under-21 football team of Malta and is controlled by the Malta Football Association.

The team is sponsored by Givova.

Competitive record

UEFA European Under-21 Championship

Current squad 
 The following players were called up for the friendly matches.
 Match dates: 24 and 27 March 2023
 Opposition: 
 Caps and goals correct as of:''' 24 September 2022, after the match against .

References

External links 
 Official page on Malta FA

European national under-21 association football teams
under-21
Youth football in Malta